Dicellomyces is a genus of fungi belonging to the family Brachybasidiaceae.

The species of this genus are found in Europe, Japan and Northern America.

Species:

Dicellomyces calami 
Dicellomyces gloeosporus 
Dicellomyces scirpi

References

Basidiomycota
Basidiomycota genera